Diamond Harbour Assembly constituency is a Legislative Assembly constituency of South 24 Parganas district in the Indian State of West Bengal.

Overview 
As per order of the Delimitation Commission in respect of the Delimitation of constituencies in the West Bengal, Diamond Harbour Assembly constituency is composed of the following:
 Diamond Harbour Municipality
 Basuldanga, Bol Siddhi Kalinagar, Dearak, Harindanga, Kanpur Dhanberia, Masat and Parulia gram panchayats of Diamond Harbour I community development block
 Kamarpole, Khordo, Mathur, Noorpur, Patra and Sarisha gram panchayats of Diamond Harbour II community development block

Diamond Harbour Assembly constituency is a part of No. 21 Diamond Harbour (Lok Sabha constituency).

Members of Legislative Assembly

Election Results

2021

Legislative Assembly Election 2011

Legislative Assembly Elections 1977-2006
In 2006 and 2001, Rishi Halder of CPI(M) won the Diamond Harbour Assembly constituency defeating his nearest rivals Subhashis Chakraborty of AITC and Amjad Ali Sardar of AITC respectively. Sheikh Daulat Ali of INC defeated Abdul Quiyom Molla of CPI(M) in 1996. Abdul Quiyom Molla of CPI(M) defeated Nazrul Islam Molla of INC in 1991, Monoranjan Kayal of INC in 1987, Dibakar Ghosh of INC in 1982, and Sankari Prasad Mondal of Janata Party in 1977.

Legislative Assembly Elections 1952-1972
Daulat Ali Sheikh of INC won in 1972. Abdul Quiyom Molla of CPI(M) won in 1971, 1969 and 1967. Jagadish Chandra Halder of INC won in 1962. Ramanuj Halder of PSP won in 1957. Charu Chandra Bhandari of KMPP won in 1952.

References

Notes

Citations

Assembly constituencies of West Bengal
Politics of South 24 Parganas district
Diamond Harbour